Ben & Ara, is a 2015 United States–Cameroon Romantic drama film directed by Nnegest Likké and co-produced by Joseph Baird, Constance Ejuma, Q'orianka Kilcher, Matthew Norsworthy and Samone Norsworthy for Nursing Tybalt Productions, Wonder Worthy Productions and N-Vision Pictures. The film revolves around two Ph.D. candidates, one an African Muslim and the other an agnostic, where they begin a romance after meeting at a museum but later discover that a love between different cultures and religions may have consequences.

The film stars Joseph Baird and Constance Ejuma in lead roles, with Akuyoe Graham, Q'orianka Kilcher, Michael Chieffo and William Mark McCullough in supporting roles. The film received positive reviews and won several awards as well as screened at international film festivals. It had its premiere in September 2015 at the Miami Independent Film Festival. In 2016, the film won the awards for Best Picture and Best Actress at the Indie Film Festival. Main actress Constance Ejuma won the Best Actress Award at the Nevada Women's Film Festival. In 2016, the film won the award for Best Diaspora film at the African Movie Academy Awards (AMAA).

Cast
 Joseph Baird as Ben
 Constance Ejuma as Ara
 Akuyoe Graham as Quismah
 Q'orianka Kilcher as Gabrielle
 Michael Chieffo as Professor Hayes
 William Mark McCullough as Manny
 Momo Dione as Najeeb 
 Emily Saliers as Andrea
 Craig Michael Beck as Frank
 Mildred Aldaya as Sasha
 Elizabeth Brewster as Secretary 2
 Haley Craft as Maxine
 Kristian Nicole Jackson as Secretary 1
 Julie Kessler as Doctor
 Austin Martin as Nnegest Likke'
 Charlotte Norsworthy as Jessica
 Samone Norsworthy as Lana
 Nital Patel as Professor Chopra
 James W. Ryder as Ken
 Dustin Seabolt as Vaughn
 Pepi Streiff as Female Professor (voice)
 Ryan Surratt as Mark Chatham
 Alyssa Taylor as Carol
 Ben Youcef as Johnnie

References

External links
 
 Trailer of Ben & Ara on YouTube

2015 independent films
American drama films
Cameroonian drama films
Fictional couples